The following is a list of fire departments in the U.S. state of Georgia:

 Action Fire Protection
 Adairsville Fire Department
 Adel Fire Department
 Adrian Fire Department
 Alamo Fire Department
 Albany Fire Department
 Alma Fire Department
 Ambrose Fire Department
 Americus Fire Department
 Appling Fire Department
 Atlanta Fire Rescue Department
 Augusta Fire Department
 Bern Volunteer Fire Department
 Cherokee County Fire & Emergency Services
 Cobb County Fire & Emergency Services
 Columbia County Fire Rescue (Class 1)
 Columbus Fire and EMS* 
 DeKalb County Fire and Rescue
 Gwinnett County Fire & Emergency Services
 Port Wentworth Fire Department
 Savannah Fire & Emergency Services
 Smyrna Fire Department

 
[[Category:Georgia (U.S. state)-related lists|Fire departments]